John Walter Farmstead, also known as Lengauer House, is a historic home located in Washington Township, Westmoreland County, Pennsylvania.  The house was built in 1848, and is a two-story, "L"-shaped red brick dwelling, five bays wide in the Greek Revival style. It has a low-pitched, slate covered gable roof.  The front facade has a three bay, hipped roof porch. Associated with the house is a contributing bank barn, built about 1846, and spring house, built in 1912.

It was added to the National Register of Historic Places in 1995.

References

Houses on the National Register of Historic Places in Pennsylvania
Greek Revival houses in Pennsylvania
Houses completed in 1848
Houses in Westmoreland County, Pennsylvania
National Register of Historic Places in Westmoreland County, Pennsylvania